Tricia Sullivan (born July 7, 1968 in New Jersey, United States) is a science fiction writer. She also writes fantasy under the pseudonym Valery Leith.

She moved to the United Kingdom in 1995. In 1999 she won the Arthur C. Clarke Award for her novel Dreaming in Smoke. Her novels Maul, Lightborn, and Occupy Me have also been shortlisted for the Clarke award, in 2004, 2011, and 2017 respectively.

Sullivan has studied music and martial arts. Her partner is the martial artist Steve Morris, with whom she has three children. They live in Shropshire.

Bibliography

Science fiction 
The Question Eaters (1995) (Short Story)
Lethe (1995)
Someone to Watch over Me (1997)
Dreaming in Smoke (1998)
Maul (2003)
Double Vision (2005)
Sound Mind (2007)
Lightborn (2010)
Occupy Me (2016)
Sweet Dreams (2017)

Fantasy fiction 
Shadowboxer (2014)

Everien series (as Valery Leith)
The Company of Glass (1999)
The Riddled Night (2000)
The Way of the Rose (2001)

References

External links
 Official website

1968 births
Living people
American emigrants to England
Writers from New Jersey
British science fiction writers
Women science fiction and fantasy writers
British women novelists
20th-century British novelists
21st-century British novelists
20th-century American women writers
21st-century American women writers
American expatriates in England